The 1845 Michigan gubernatorial election was held on November 4, 1845. Democratic nominee Alpheus Felch defeated Whig nominee Stephen Vickery with 50.94% of the vote.

General election

Candidates
Major party candidates
Alpheus Felch, Democratic
Stephen Vickery, Whig
Other candidates
James G. Birney, Liberty

Results

References

1845
Michigan
Gubernatorial
November 1845 events